Pinky is a 1949 American drama film directed by Elia Kazan and produced by Darryl F. Zanuck. The screenplay was adapted by Philip Dunne and Dudley Nichols based on Cid Ricketts Sumner's 1946 novel Quality. It stars Jeanne Crain as the title character, a young light-skinned black woman who passes for white. It also stars Ethel Barrymore, Ethel Waters and William Lundigan.

Pinky was released in the United States on September 29, 1949 by 20th Century-Fox. It generated considerable controversy because of its subject of race relations and the casting of Crain to play a black woman. It was nonetheless a critical and commercial success, and earned Crain, Barrymore and Waters Academy Award nominations.

Plot

Pinky Johnson returns to the South to visit Dicey, the illiterate black laundress grandmother who raised her. Pinky confesses to Dicey that she passed for white while studying to be a nurse in the North. She had also fallen in love with a white man, Dr. Thomas Adams, who knows nothing about her black heritage.

Pinky is harassed by racist local law enforcement while attempting to reclaim money owed to her grandmother. Two white men try to sexually assault her. Dr. Canady, a black physician, asks Pinky to train black nursing students, but Pinky plans to return to the North.

Dicey asks Pinky to stay temporarily to care for her ailing, elderly white friend and neighbor Miss Em. Pinky has always disliked Miss Em and considers her another of the many bigots in the area. Pinky relents and agrees to tend Miss Em after learning that when Dicey had pneumonia, Miss Em cared for her. Pinky nurses the strong-willed Miss Em, but does not hide her resentment. However, as they spend time together, she grows to like and respect her patient.

Miss Em bequeaths Pinky her stately house and property when she dies, but greedy relative Melba Wooley challenges the will. Everyone advises Pinky that she has no chance of winning, but she begs Miss Em's old friend Judge Walker, who is nearing retirement, to defend her in court. With great reluctance, he agrees to take the case. Pinky washes clothes by hand when her grandmother is sick in order to pay court expenses. At the trial, despite hostile white spectators and the absence of the only defense witness, presiding judge Shoreham unexpectedly rules in Pinky's favor. When Pinky thanks her attorney, he coldly informs her that justice was served, but not the interests of the community.

Tom, who has arrived from the North after tracking Pinky down, wants her to sell the inherited property, resume her masquerade as a white woman, marry him and leave the South, but she refuses, firmly believing that Miss Em intended her to use the house and property for some purpose, and Tom leaves. Pinky establishes a clinic and nursery school on the property.

Cast

 Jeanne Crain as Patricia "Pinky" Johnson
 Ethel Barrymore as Miss Em
 Ethel Waters as Dicey Johnson
 William Lundigan as Dr. Thomas "Tom" Adams
 Basil Ruysdael as Judge Walker
 Kenny Washington as Dr. Canady
 Nina Mae McKinney as Rozelia
 Griff Barnett as Dr. Joe McGill
 Frederick O'Neal as Jake Walters
 Evelyn Varden as Melba Wooley
 Raymond Greenleaf as Judge Shoreham
 Juanita Moore as Nurse
 Arthur Hunnicutt as Police Chief (uncredited)
 Harry Tenbrook as Townsman (uncredited)

Production
John Ford was originally hired to direct the film but was replaced after one week because producer Darryl F. Zanuck was unhappy with the dailies.

Both Lena Horne and Dorothy Dandridge were interested in playing the role of Pinky. In the end, Jeanne Crain was chosen. Elia Kazan, who assumed directing duties when John Ford was fired, was unhappy with the casting choice, and later said, "Jeanne Crain was a sweet girl, but she was like a Sunday school teacher. I did my best with her, but she didn't have any fire. The only good thing about her was that it went so far in the direction of no temperament that you felt Pinky was floating through all of her experiences without reacting to them, which is what 'passing' is."

Banning and Supreme Court ruling
Pinky enjoyed wide success in the southern United States, but was banned by the city of Marshall, Texas, for its subject matter. In Marshall, W. L. Gelling managed the segregated Paramount Theater, where blacks were restricted to the balcony. Gelling booked Pinky for exhibition in February 1950, a year in which the First Amendment did not protect movies, subsequent to Mutual Film Corporation v. Industrial Commission of Ohio (1915).

Marshall's city commission "reactivated" the Board of Censors, established by a 1921 ordinance, and designated five members who demanded the submission of the picture for approval. They disapproved its showing, stating that it was "prejudicial to the best interests of the citizens of the City of Marshall." Gelling exhibited the film anyway and was charged with a misdemeanor. Three board members testified that they objected to the picture because it depicted a white man retaining his love for a woman after learning that she was a Negro, a white man kissing and embracing a Negro woman and two white ruffians assaulting Pinky after she tells them that she is colored. 

Gelling was convicted and fined $200. He appealed the conviction to the U.S. Supreme Court, which decided the landmark free-speech case of Joseph Burstyn, Inc v. Wilson (1952) that extended First Amendment protection to films. The court then overturned Gelling's conviction.

Box-office performance
Pinky was 20th Century-Fox's second-most-successful film of 1949 (after I Was a Male War Bride) and the year's sixth-highest-grossing.

Awards and nominations

See also

1949 in film
List of black Academy Award winners and nominees
List of movies with more than one Academy Award nomination in the same category

References

External links
 
 
 
 
 

1949 films
1949 drama films
1940s English-language films
20th Century Fox films
American black-and-white films
American drama films
Films about race and ethnicity
Films about racism
Films based on American novels
Films directed by Elia Kazan
Films produced by Darryl F. Zanuck
Films scored by Alfred Newman
Films with screenplays by Dudley Nichols
Films with screenplays by Philip Dunne
1940s American films